James R. Reilly (January 31, 1945 – April 4, 2022) was an American politician who served as a Republican member of the Illinois House of Representatives.

Early life
James R. Reilly was born January 31, 1945, in Springfield, Illinois. He moved to Jacksonville, Illinois in 1962. He graduated from Illinois College in 1967 and from the University of Chicago Law School in 1972. He returned to Jacksonville and served as its city attorney. In 1976, he was elected as one of three representatives from the 49th district to the Illinois House of Representatives. Prior to serving in the Illinois House of Representatives, he worked as an aide to State Representative George Burditt and taught in Winchester, Illinois for two years.

Legislative career
During his freshman term his duties in the General Assembly included: Minority Spokesman, State Government Committee; Vice Chairman, Joint Committee on Administrative Rules; Member, Appropriations II and Elementary and Secondary Education Committees, and Commission on Mental Health and Developmental Disabilities.

Government career and appointments
Governor James R. Thompson made Reilly his chief of staff. After a staff reorganization, Reilly was named Deputy Governor with a portfolio including budget development and legislative negotiations. Reilly then left to establish the Metropolitan Pier and Exposition Authority. After Governor Jim Edgar's Chief of Staff Kirk Dillard left the administration to run for the Illinois Senate seat of retiring incumbent Thomas McCracken Jr., Reilly became Edgar's Chief of Staff.

Death
Reilly died on April 4, 2022, at Saint Joseph Villa assisted facility in Chicago, Illinois.

Further reading
  Reilly, Jim (August 10, 2009). Interview with Jim Reilly #ISG-A-L-2009-026. Jim Edgar Project (Interview). Interviewed by Mark DePue. Springfield, Illinois: Abraham Lincoln Presidential Library Oral History Program. Archived from the original on June 13, 2021. Retrieved September 28, 2022.

References

1945 births
2022 deaths
Illinois College alumni
University of Chicago Law School alumni
Politicians from Springfield, Illinois
Politicians from Jacksonville, Illinois
Republican Party members of the Illinois House of Representatives
Illinois lawyers
20th-century American politicians